Coleophora tecta is a moth of the family Coleophoridae. It is found in Kazakhstan.

The larvae feed on the shoot apex and the generative organs of Kochia prostrata.

References

tecta
Moths of Asia
Moths described in 1989